The Source Four PAR is a stage lighting instrument manufactured by Electronic Theatre Controls.  The name of the fixture derives from the stylistic and construction features it shares with ETC's Source Four.  The suffix identifies the Source Four PAR as a parabolic aluminized reflector (PAR). It is designed and marketed as a modern, energy efficient alternative to traditional PAR fixtures used in theatrical and broadcast lighting.

Construction

The Source Four PAR is designed to use the same HPL lamp used in other ETC Source Four fixtures.  The HPL lamp, combined with newer aluminum reflector technology, is designed to allow for more light output while using a lower wattage. The light output of a 575 watt HPL in a Source Four PAR is listed as comparable to that of a 1000 watt traditional PAR64. The Source Four PAR can also be fitted with 375, 550, or 750 watt HPL lamps.

The fixture allows for beam and field adjustment using interchangeable lenses, and is designed for "shaping" the output (with the multifaceted lenses) in the same way that traditional PAR lamps are intended to be rotated inside a fixture for a more horizontal or vertical beam orientation. ETC manufactures five interchangeable glass lenses for this fixture (four come included, while the fifth, the XWFL, is sold separately.) This interchangeability of the lenses is often considered an advantage, since traditional PAR fixtures require a stock of different lamps to achieve various beam angles.  This allows for a greater amount of flexibility from the Source Four PAR.

The shortened barrel of a Source Four PAR (relative to a traditional PAR fixture) makes the light source more visible at a much greater angle.  In some cases, this may be considered an unwelcome effect as it can cause lens flare or change the audience's perception of a theatrical scene. top hats or barn doors attach to Source Four PARs to eliminate this source visibility.

The Source Four PAR can be two or three times more expensive than traditional PAR cans, however replacement lamps are generally significantly less expensive than traditional PAR lamps, so the cost is considered to even out over time. Source Four PARs are also promoted as being "greener", in that HPL lamps use much less power to achieve the same light output.  The HPL lamps are also significantly smaller than traditional PAR lamps, which have the reflector and lens integrated into the lamp, and therefore less material may be placed into landfills.

Source Four PAR fixtures have more parts than, and, in some environments, including touring and rentals, require a greater measure of regular maintenance than traditional PAR cans. Nevertheless, industry professionals generally agree that the advantages of the fixture (flexibility, size, weight, light output, and cost-over-time) outweigh these considerations.

The Source Four PAR may have revolutionized fixture maintenance and inventory control in much the same way the Source Four Ellipsoidal Reflector Spot (ERS) did for the traditional spotlight, however many lighting designers argue that the fixture lacks the "raw" quality of light achieved by a traditional PAR can.  Also, the distinct "oblong" shape of the beam of light from a traditional PAR lacks definition when used with a Source Four PAR's medium (MFL) or wide (WFL) flood lenses, and is completely non-existent when the very narrow (VNSP) or narrow (NSP) is utilized.  Depending on the needs of the lighting designer, this could be considered a disadvantage.

Source Four PARNel

A variation of the Source Four PAR is the Source Four PARNel, a wash lighting fixture intended to be an alternative for Fresnel lanterns.  The name PARNel is a portmanteau of PAR and Fresnel.  The PARNel operates with 750-, 575- or 375-watt HPL lamps that are compatible with all other Source Four fixtures. Unlike traditional Fresnel lanterns, where adjusting the light beam between flood and spot is accomplished by moving the lamp and reflector assembly relative to the lens, the PARNel is focused by rotating a stippled lens.  It can be focused from 25- to 47-degree field angles.  The PARNel also uses the enhanced aluminum reflector technology, which theoretically allows a 575 watt lamp to output more light than a standard 1000 watt Fresnel lantern.

References

External links
 Source Four PAR Manual
 Sourced Four PARnel Manual

Stage lighting instruments